Ibidion is the type genus of longhorn beetles in the tribe Ibidionini.

This is a monotypic genus with Ibidion comatum (a.k.a. Neoibidion comatum) the only species.

References

Ibidionini
Monotypic beetle genera